Hong Kong competed at the 2012 Summer Olympics in London, from 27 July to 12 August 2012. This was the territory's fifteenth appearance at the Olympics, having not attended the 1980 Summer Olympics in Moscow because of its support for the United States boycott.

The Sports Federation and Olympic Committee of Hong Kong, China sent a total of 42 athletes to the Games, 22 men and 20 women, to compete in 13 sports. This was also the youngest delegation in Hong Kong's Olympic history, with about half the team under the age of 25, and many of them were expected to reach their peak in time for the 2016 Summer Olympics in Rio de Janeiro. Eight Hong Kong athletes had competed in Beijing, including track and road cyclist Wong Kam Po, who competed at his fifth Olympic games as the oldest and most experienced athlete, at age 39. Three other athletes made their third Olympic appearance: swimmer Hannah Wilson, table tennis player Tie Ya Na, and single sculls rower So Sau Wah. Hong Kong also made its Olympic debut in men's sprint relay event, artistic gymnastics, and weightlifting.

Hong Kong left London with only a single Olympic medal, their third in history. Road and track cyclist Lee Wai Sze, who was the nation's flag bearer at the opening ceremony, won the bronze medal in the women's keirin event.

Medallists

Archery

Hong Kong has qualified one man.

Athletics

Hong Kong has qualified one team of men's 4x100 relay, and one female sprinter.

Key
 Note – Ranks given for track events are within the athlete's heat only
 Q = Qualified for the next round
 q = Qualified for the next round as a fastest loser or, in field events, by position without achieving the qualifying target
 NR = National record
 N/A = Round not applicable for the event
 Bye = Athlete not required to compete in round

Men

Women

Badminton

Legend: Q=Qualified

Cycling

Road

Track
Sprint

Keirin

Omnium

Mountain biking

Fencing

Hong Kong has qualified 6 fencers.
Men

Women

Gymnastics

Artistic
Men

Women

Judo

Hong Kong has qualified 1 judoka

Rowing

Hong Kong has qualified the following boats.

Men

Qualification Legend: FA=Final A (medal); FB=Final B (non-medal); FC=Final C (non-medal); FD=Final D (non-medal); FE=Final E (non-medal); FF=Final F (non-medal); SA/B=Semifinals A/B; SC/D=Semifinals C/D; SE/F=Semifinals E/F; QF=Quarterfinals; R=Repechage

Sailing

Hong Kong has qualified 1 boat for each of the following events

Men

Women

M = Medal race;  EL = Eliminated – did not advance into the medal race;

Shooting

Women

Swimming

Swimmers have so far achieved qualifying standards in the following events (up to a maximum of 2 swimmers in each event at the Olympic Qualifying Time (OQT), and potentially 1 at the Olympic Selection Time (OST)):

Women

Table tennis

Hong Kong has qualified four athletes for singles table tennis events. Based on their world rankings as of 16 May 2011 Tang Peng and Jiang Tianyi have qualified for the men's event; Tie Ya Na and Jiang Huajun have qualified for the women's.

Men

Women

Weightlifting

Hong Kong has qualified one athlete.

References

Nations at the 2012 Summer Olympics
2012
2012 in Hong Kong sport